John Pascal (July 8, 1932 – January 7, 1981) was an American playwright, screenwriter, author, and journalist.

Education
John Robert Pascal was born on July 8, 1932 in Brooklyn, New York. He received his journalism degree at New York University.

Career
Pascal was a playwright and screenwriter. His works included collaboration on the book for the Broadway musical George M!, which was also released on NBC, and on scripts for the ABC Daytime soap opera The Young Marrieds. With his second wife, Pascal worked on various projects including The Young Marrieds and The Strange Case of Patty Hearst. The Pascals also worked with Ms. Pascal's brother, Broadway playwright and librettist Michael Stewart, writing the book for George M!

Pascal was a novelist, as well, authoring such books as The Strange Case of Patty Hearst, The Jean Harlow Story, and Marilyn Monroe: The Complete Story of Her Life, Her Loves and Her Death. Early in his career, he worked as a journalist and an editor for The New York Times. He later developed and wrote a weekly Sunday column for New York's Newsday, which ran until his death.

Personal life
His first wife was poet Donna J. Stone, with whom he had a son, Matthew. He later married children's author Francine Pascal.

Death
Pascal died of lung cancer on January 7, 1981.

References 

 George M! (Book by Michael Stewart, John Pascal, and Francine Pascal: Tams-Witmark, 1968; National Broadcasting Co., 1970)
 The Strange Case of Patty Hearst (John Pascal and Francine Pascal: Signet Books, 1974)
 The Jean Harlow Story (John Pascal: Popular Library, 1964)
 Marilyn Monroe: The Complete Story of Her Life, Her Loves and Her Death (John Pascal: Popular Library, 1962)
 The Young Marrieds (John Pascal and Francine Pascal: American Broadcasting Co., 1964–1966)
 The Continuum Encyclopedia of Children's Literature (Continuum International Publishing Group, 2005)
 The New York Times Obituary: John R. Pascal (The New York Times Co., 1981)
 Newsday Obituary: John Robert Pascal (Newsday, LLC, 1981)

External links 
 
 Internet Broadway Database: George M!
 Internet Movie Database: George M!
 Tams-Witmark Music Library: George M!
 The New York Times Obituary: John R. Pascal

20th-century American novelists
American male novelists
American male screenwriters
American soap opera writers
American columnists
Journalists from New York City
1932 births
1981 deaths
20th-century American dramatists and playwrights
American male television writers
American male dramatists and playwrights
20th-century American male writers
Novelists from New York (state)
20th-century American non-fiction writers
American male non-fiction writers
Screenwriters from New York (state)
20th-century American screenwriters